Charlie Ian Paul Rouillon (born 20 August 1981), known professionally as Charlie Sloth, is a British DJ, hype man, producer and TV presenter.

Early life 
Charlie Ian Paul Rouillon was born on 20 August 1981. He was raised in the London Borough of Camden and attended Haverstock School. He is an avid supporter of Liverpool F.C. in 2004 he starred in a documentary Tower block dreams ep.1 “spittin & shottin” by David O’Neil documenting the hip hop and grime scene in London and Southend

Career
Sloth came to notability in 2007 after he won Most Original Video at the CraveFest Awards Canada for music video "Guided Tour of Camden".

Most of Sloth's career as a radio DJ has been spent on BBC Radio 1 and BBC Radio 1Xtra, presenting The Rap Show on Saturday nights and his weeknight late show The 8th. He was previously a presenter on the weekday drivetime show on BBC Radio 1Xtra.

His trademark freestyle brand, Fire in the Booth, has been described as "...a real mark of prestige in the scene, especially for newcomers" with MCs from grime and hip-hop coming into the studio to perform. Akala, Avelino, Devlin, Professor Green, K Koke, Lowkey, Mic Righteous, Bugzy Malone, Big Narstie, Tinie Tempah, Wretch 32, Drake, Big Shaq, Migos and others have performed on Fire in the Booth. Canadian rapper Drake's appearance was "...four or five years in the making", with Sloth noting in 2018 that it was one of his favourite moments of the show.

2007
Sloth created a weekly online video series Being Charlie Sloth, which was picked up by WorldStarHipHop.com. The show ran for 59 episodes.

2008–2019
In 2008, Sloth won Best Rap/Hip-Hop/R&B Unsigned Artist at the CraveFest awards in Canada. He released Hard Being Good in the same year.

Sloth presented the daily drivetime show on BBC Radio 1Xtra from September 2012 until November 2017

On 6 November 2017, Sloth began presenting a new late-night show, The 8th, which was simulcast on Radio 1 and 1Xtra from Monday to Thursday from 9 until 11 pm. The show was notable for its post-watershed language and content. Uniquely for Radio 1, swearing, and graphic sexual conversations were routinely a part of the programme, seen by station bosses as a way of attracting younger listeners.

Apple Music
On 3 October 2018, Sloth announced he would be leaving BBC 1Xtra, with his last planned show being on 3 November. This was however cut short on 20 October when Radio 1 "agreed with Charlie" that he would not be completing his remaining 10 shows. This followed Charlie Sloth controversially "storming the stage" at the Audio and Productions Awards show on 18 October. On 14 January 2019, Sloth announced via Instagram that he will be joining Apple Music and Beats 1 and will be bringing Fire In The Booth over. He also hosts the Rap Show and curates playlists for Apple Music.

Roc Nation
In August 2020 it was announced that Sloth had signed a deal with Jay Z's Roc Nation. The deal is a partnership which sees Roc Nation look after all of his assets on a worldwide deal.

Political views 

In November 2019, along with 34 other musicians, Sloth signed a letter endorsing the Labour Party leader Jeremy Corbyn in the 2019 UK general election with a call to end austerity.

Discography

Albums
 The Plug (2017)

Mixtapes
 The Big Boot (2004)
 Secret Society (2006)
 Hard Being Good (2008)
 The Black Book (2010)
 Hood Heat Vol. 1 (2014)
 Hood Heat Vol. 2 (2015)

References

External links
 

Living people
English hip hop musicians
English record producers
Grime music artists
BBC Radio 1 presenters
1981 births
British hip hop DJs
DJs from London
People from Camden Town
BBC Radio 1Xtra presenters